The  or the Dai-Ichi Kangyo Group was the largest Japanese keiretsu in the late 1990s.

The group emerged after World War II and coalesced around the Dai-Ichi Kangyo Bank. Two of DKB's largest clients, Kawasaki Heavy Industries and Furukawa Electric, led their own respective corporate groups with a cross-supply relationship between the two. The Kawasaki and Furukawa groups agreed to begin holding presidents' meetings in 1966. Itochu, which historically supplied Kawasaki with raw materials, became the main general trading company for the combined group.

The group's presidents began regular  meetings in 1971. Also in that year, the group's name developed from the merger of Dai-Ichi Bank and Nippon Kangyo Bank. In 1998, an announcement was made that the Dai-Ichi Kangyo Bank was to be merged with Fuji Bank and the Industrial Bank of Japan to form Mizuho Financial Group. The resulting group, which was established in September 2000, was the largest banking group in the world with assets of 140 trillion yen. The next few years saw a parallel consolidation of their keiretsu industrial partners and saw the group grow to 150 trillion yen in assets (30% GDP).

Companies
 Asahi Mutual Life Insurance 
 The Dai-ichi Mutual Life Insurance Company 
 Daiichi Sankyo
 Dentsu 
 Fujitsu 
 Hitachi 
 IHI Corporation
 Isuzu
 ITOCHU
 JFE Holdings
 Kawasaki Heavy Industries
 K Line
 Kobe Steel
 Meiji Seika
 Mizuho Financial Group
 Nippon Columbia
 Seibu Department Stores
 Sojitz 
 Sompo Japan Insurance
 Taiheiyo Cement
 Tokyo Broadcasting System
 Tokyo Dome
 The Tokyo Electric Power Company
 Tokyo FM
 Toshiba
 Toyota
 Yokohama Rubber Company

See also
 Fuyo Group

References

Conglomerate companies based in Tokyo
Defunct companies of Japan
Keiretsu
Companies established in the 1940s
Companies disestablished in the 1990s
1940s establishments in Japan
1990s disestablishments in Japan